Adelpha cytherea, the smooth-banded sister, is a species of butterfly of the family Nymphalidae. It is found in the Central and South America.

Subspecies
A. c. cytherea (Peru, Bolivia)
A. c. aea (C. & R. Felder, [1867]) (Brazil: Espírito Santo, Rio de Janeiro)
A. c. daguana Fruhstorfer, 1913 (Ecuador, Colombia)
A. c. insularis Fruhstorfer, 1913 (Trinidad)
A. c. marcia Fruhstorfer, 1913 (Honduras and Guatemala to Colombia)
A. c. nahua Grose-Smith, 1898 (Venezuela, Colombia)
A. c. olbia (C. & R. Felder, [1867]) (Colombia)

References

Butterflies described in 1758
Adelpha
Fauna of Brazil
Nymphalidae of South America
Butterflies of Central America
Taxa named by Carl Linnaeus